Wu Ta-ch'i or Wu Daqi (1926–1993) was the descendant of the famous Wu-style t'ai chi ch'uan founders Wu Ch'uan-yu (1834–1902) and Wu Chien-ch'uan (1870–1942). He directed Wu-style t'ai chi ch'uan instruction outside of Mainland China after the death of his father Wu Kung-i (1900–1970) and brother Wu Ta-kuei (1923–1972) from the Wu-style t'ai chi ch'uan headquarters in Hong Kong internationally.

Biography
Born in China to a distinguished martial arts family, Wu Ta-ch'i, with his brother Wu Ta-kuei, sister Wu Yen-hsia as well as his first cousin Wu Ta-hsin all endured strict training from their nationally famous grandfather and father. Being the grandchildren of the family, they were traditionally expected to inherit the family art of t'ai chi ch'uan whom their great-grandfather Wu Ch'uan-yu had first learned from Yang Luchan (1799–1872) and his son Yang Pan-hou (1837–1890).

When Wu Kung-i migrated with his family to Hong Kong in the 1940s, Wu Ta-ch'i assisted his father in the propagation and teaching of t'ai chi ch'uan. During the 1950s under the instructions of Wu Kung-i, Wu Ta-ch'i and his cousin Wu Ta-hsin (1933–2005) travelled extensively to Malaysia and Singapore to start and support academies promoting Wu-style t'ai chi. Their efforts met with success, making the region a key centre of Wu-style t'ai chi ch'uan outside of Hong Kong and China. Wu Ta-ch'i's chief disciple Chu Weng-Moon in Malaysia and his fellow disciples continue to teach Wu-style t'ai chi ch'uan.

In 1974, Wu Ta-ch'i was invited by the Chinese Canadian Kuo Shu Federation to teach in Toronto, Ontario, Canada where he established the first Wu family school outside of Asia. The Canadian school founded by Wu Ta-ch'i was entrusted to his nephew Wu Kuang-yu (Eddie) in 1976.

Wu Ta-ch'i was a member of the advisory board of the Martial Art Association in Hong Kong.

References

External links
 http://www.wustyle.com/ International Wu Style Tai Chi Chuan Federation website
 http://www.wustyledetroit.com/ Detroit, Michigan Wu style website

1926 births
1993 deaths
Chinese tai chi practitioners
Manchu martial artists